Nathan Clarke (born Nathan Clarke Browne) is a British actor and voice actor. He trained at East 15 Acting School.

Career
Before attending East 15 Acting School, he worked as an extra in both Harry Potter and the Order of the Phoenix and Harry Potter and the Half-Blood Prince. Since graduating, Clarke has worked extensively in theatre, film and television.

His most notable roles have included voicing the character of Alfie, in the CGI animated children's action film Thomas & Friends: Sodor's Legend of the Lost Treasure (2015), and playing Munir Al-Yazbek in the American drama television series, Tyrant. He has also played Danny Boyd in Series 7 and 8 of CBBC’s 4 O'Clock Club. Theatre work includes stage productions for the Royal National Theatre, Trafalgar Studios, the Royal Court Theatre, and the Watford Palace Theatre.

Filmography

References

External links
 
 Nathan Clarke on Twitter

1989 births
Alumni of East 15 Acting School
British male actors
Living people
Male actors from Essex
English male actors
English male film actors
British people of Indian descent